"The Beginning and the End" may refer to:

 The Beginning and the End (Bizzy Bone album), 2004
 The Beginning and the End (Clifford Brown album), 1973
 The Beginning and the End (1960 film), a 1960 Egyptian film
 The Beginning and the End (1993 film), a 1993 Mexican film
 The Beginning and the End (novel), by Naguib Mahfouz
 "The Beginning and the End" (Millennium), an episode from season two of the TV fictional mystery series Millennium
 "The Beginning and the End", a song by Orchestral Manoeuvres in the Dark from the album Architecture & Morality
 "The Beginning and the End", a song by Isis from the album Oceanic
 The Beginning and the End in History a book by Ibn Kathir, a classic text on Sunni Islamic history.

See also
 The Beginning of the End (disambiguation)
 A Beginning and an End, a 1960 Egyptian film
 Alpha and Omega, an appellation of God in the Book of Revelation
 First and Last (disambiguation)